Jiří Novák and David Rikl were the defending champions, but lost in first round to Lan Bale and Grant Stafford.

Paul Haarhuis and Jared Palmer won the title by defeating Olivier Delaître and Leander Paes 6–3, 6–4 in the final.

Seeds
All four seeds received a bye into the second round.

Draw

Finals

Top half

Bottom half

External links
 Official Results Archive (ATP)
 Official Results Archive (ITF)

1999 ATP Tour